Zachary David Shada (born November 25, 1992) is an American actor, producer and director.

Life and career
Shada was born in Boise, Idaho. His brothers are actors Josh and Jeremy Shada.

He appeared as Thin Boy in Charlie's Angels: Full Throttle (2003), and as Nick Davis in the 2005 television movies Jane Doe: Vanishing Act and its sequels. He has appeared in two episodes of Lost, three episodes of Wizards of Waverly Place, and voiced Slightly in Tinker Bell, and Comet in Space Chimps. 

Shada voiced the character Finn in the pilot for the Cartoon Network series Adventure Time. His brother Jeremy was later cast in his role, which was renamed Finn the Human. 

Along with his brother Jeremy, he is a member of the pop punk band Make Out Monday.

Filmography

Awards and nominations

References

External links

1992 births
Living people
American male child actors
American male voice actors
Male actors from Idaho
People from Boise, Idaho
21st-century American male actors